The Dartmouth Institute for Health Policy and Clinical Practice (TDI) is an organization within Dartmouth College "dedicated to improving healthcare through education, research, policy reform, leadership improvement, and communication with patients and the public." It was founded in 1988 by John Wennberg as the Center for the Evaluative Clinical Sciences (CECS); a reorganization in 2007 led to TDI's current structure.

The institute provides a graduate-level education program involving elements of both Dartmouth's Graduate Arts and Sciences Programs and the Geisel School of Medicine. It grants Masters in Public Health degrees as well as Master of Science and Doctor of Philosophy in Health Policy and Clinical Science degrees. The institute is located at One Medical Center Drive, WTRB, Level 5 on the Dartmouth Hitchcock Hospital campus, Lebanon, NH. The institute's largest policy product is the Dartmouth Atlas of Health Care, which documents unwarranted variation in the American healthcare system.

Dr. Anna Tosteson has served as interim director since October 2018, when former director Elliott S. Fisher and chief of strategy Adam Keller were placed on paid administrative leave following a complaint about conduct in the workplace. The investigation into the misconduct concluded in April 2019 and resulted in Fisher's demotion and Keller's resignation. This followed the resignation of Professor H. Gilbert Welch in 2018 after Dartmouth College concluded he committed plagiarism. As a condition of his return directly set by the Geisel School of Medicine, Fisher has been banned physically from the 5th floor of the Williamson Building, where most of TDI is housed, for a period of two years.

References

Dartmouth College
Health Policy and Clinical Practice Program
Health policy in the United States